Yachenahalli is a panchayat town in Mysore district in the state of Karnataka, India. It is located 35 km from Mysore and 17 km from Mandya. The nearest city is Bannur with 10 km distance.

Geography
It has an average elevation of 654 metres (2145 feet).

Transport

By Road 
Bannur, Tirumakudal - Narsipur, Malavalli, Kollegal, Mandya are the nearby by towns, having road connectivity to Yachenahalli which is located on Bannur - Mandya Main Road.

Demographics
2001 Census Details

 India census, Yachenahalli had a population of 3,190. Males constitute 51% of the population and females 49%. Yachenahalli has an average literacy rate of 59%, lower than the national average of 59.5%; with 54% of the males and 46% of females literate. 11% of the population is under 6 years of age.

2011 Census Details 

Yachenahalli Local Language is Kannada. Yachenahalli Village Total population is 3168 and number of houses are 749. Female Population is 49.6%. Village literacy rate is 57.1% and the Female Literacy rate is 24.4%.

Population

See also 
 Bannur
 Mandya
 Aarakere
 Somanathapura
 T. Narasipura
 Talakadu

References

Cities and towns in Mysore district